Deoksugung, also known as Gyeongun-gung, Deoksugung Palace, or Deoksu Palace, is a walled compound of palaces in Seoul that was inhabited by members of Korea's Royal Family during the Joseon monarchy until the annexation of Korea by Japan in 1910. It is one of the "Five Grand Palaces" built by the kings of the Joseon Dynasty and designated as a Historic Site. The buildings are of varying styles, including some of natural cryptomeria wood), painted wood, and stucco. Some buildings were built of stone to replicate western palatial structures. 

In addition to the traditional palace buildings, there are also forested gardens, a statue of King Sejong the Great and the National Museum of Art, which holds special exhibitions. The palace is located near City Hall Station.

Deoksugung, like the other "Five Grand Palaces" in Seoul, was heavily damaged during the colonial period of Korea. Currently, only one third of the structures that were standing before the occupation remain.

Deoksugung Palace is special among Korean palaces. It has a modern and a western style garden and fountain. The Changing of the Royal Guard, in front of Daehanmun (Gate), is a very popular event for many visitors. The royal guard was responsible for opening and closing the palace gate during the Joseon Dynasty. Outside of the palace is a picturesque road with a stone wall.

The Deoksugung Stonewall walkway is at the heart of a popular urban myth in Seoul, as it is said that all couples who walk down this road are fated to break-up.

History
Deoksugung was originally the residence of Grand Prince Wolsan, the older brother of King Seongjong. This residence became a royal 'palace' during the Imjin war after all of the other palaces were burned in 1592 during the Imjin wars. King Seonjo was the first Joseon king to reside at the palace. King Gwanghaegun was crowned in this palace in 1608, and renamed it Gyeongun-gung (경운궁, 慶運宮) in 1611. After the official palace was moved to the rebuilt Changdeokgung in 1618, it was mostly used as an auxiliary palace was renamed Seogung (West Palace). During its history, it alternated between being a royal residential palace and a temporary residence. Gojong of Joseon ordered to restore Gyeongun-gung from August 1896.

In 1897, after the incident when Emperor Gojong took refuge in the Russian legation, he returned to this place and named it Gyeongungung again. The Government used 80,000 Dollars for constructing and expanding the facilities of palace. In 1900, electricity and fencing was installed. After Emperor Gojong abdicated the throne to Emperor Sunjong, he continued to live in this palace. In 1904, a fire destroyed some of the buildings. The palace was then renamed Deoksugung in 1907, as a reference to a wish for longevity of the emperor. Emperor Gojong died in Hamnyeongjeon.

Under Japanese rule after 1910, the palace grounds were operated as a public park, the territory was reduced to one-third and the number of buildings to one-tenth of  the original.

Buildings 
Daehanmun Gate, originally called Daeanmun before 1906, is the main gate of the current palace. The main hall, Junghwajeon Hall is where the state affairs, official meetings were held and where the throne is located. It used to be a two-story building but was rebuilt in 1906 with only one story. Junghwamun Gate is the gate that leads to the main hall. Originally it featured a walled corridor, thus allowing people to only enter the main hall through the gate. The walls were destroyed. Hamnyengjeon Hall is Emperor Gojong's bedroom, located at the east wing of the palace. This is where the fire broke out in 1904, officially because of the heating system, but there is suspicion that it was done by the Japanese colonisers to get rid of Gojong. Jeonggwanheon is a modern pavilion built in the royal garden in 1900, and was the first Western-style building in a Korean royal palace ever built. Although it is built by a Russian architect in a European style, it also features Korean elements. It was transformed into a cafeteria during the Japanese occupation. The Seokjojeon is a Neo-Renaissance style building designed by British architect John Reginald Harding, used for diplomatic and high-level government meetings. In 2014 its interior was restored to its Korean Empire-period appearance and now houses the Korean Empire History Hall.  The Seokjojeon West Building was opened in 1938 as the House of Yi Art Museum, and continues to be used as an art museum as the National Museum of Modern and Contemporary Art. Jungmyeongjeon Hall, across Deoksugung-gil separate to the rest of the palace, was built to be a royal library but when the 1904 fire broke out, the emperor temporarily used it as his private residence.

Transportation
Deoksugung entry is located 5-1 Geongdong-gil/Deoksugung-gil, Jung-gu. The nearest subway station is City Hall Station (Station #132 on Line 1, Station #201 on Line 2).

Gallery

Bibliography

References

External links

Official website from Cultural Heritage Administration
Deoksu Palace
Deoksugung : Official Seoul City Tourism
The Seoul Guide : Deoksugung Palace

Jung District, Seoul
Palaces in South Korea
Royal residences in South Korea
Buildings and structures in Seoul
Tourist attractions in Seoul